The système universitaire de documentation or SUDOC is a system used by the libraries of French universities and higher education establishments to identify, track and manage the documents in their possession. The catalog, which contains nearly 13 million references, allows students and researchers to search for bibliographical and location information in more than 3,400 documentation centers.

External links

Libraries in France
Library cataloging and classification